The pan bagnat (pronounced [pɑ̃ baˈɲa]) (pan bagna, and alternatively in French as pain bagnat) is a sandwich that is a specialty of Nice, France. The sandwich is composed of pain de campagne, a whole wheat bread, enclosing the classic salade niçoise, a salad composed mainly of raw vegetables, hard boiled eggs, anchovies and/or tuna, and olive oil, salt, and pepper. Sometimes vinegar might be added, but never mayonnaise. It has historically been prepared as a use for day-old bread.

The pan bagnat is a popular dish in the region around Nice  where it is sold in most bakeries and markets. Pan bagnat and the salade niçoise (salade nissarda), along with ratatouille (La Ratatouia Nissarda in Provençal), socca and pissaladière are strongly linked to the city of Nice, where they have been developed over time out of local ingredients. It is sometimes served as an hors d'oeuvre.

Etymology
The name of the sandwich comes from the local Provençal language, Nissart, in which pan banhat and the alternative spelling pan bagnat mean "bathed bread". It is often misspelled "pain bagnat", with the French pain rather than genuine local pan.

Preparation
Pan bagnat is prepared using bread or homemade bread that is generally round (French: pain de ménage) optionally rubbed with garlic, tuna, anchovies, sliced tomato, olives, olive oil, salt and pepper. Additional ingredients to prepare the dish can include arugula, basil, artichoke, and red wine vinegar. The olive oil is typically used on the bread, which may be marinated or soaked in the oil and then strained off, hence the name "bathed bread". The garlic is sometimes used to rub the bread with.

Similar dishes
Pan bagnat is partly related to the muffuletta sandwich. and is a close relative of the Tunisian Tuna Sandwich (Casse-Croûte Tunisien).

See also

 List of sandwiches

Notes

References

External links
Commune Libre du Pan Bagnat: Association pour la Défense et la Promotion de l'Appellation Pan Bagnat
Article in Nice Matin on the Pan Bagnat Recipe
 Article in Nice Matin on various sandwiches wrongly labelled Pan Bagnat

Cuisine of Provence
Occitan cuisine
French sandwiches
Egg sandwiches
Seafood sandwiches